Melese chozeba is a moth of the family Erebidae. It was described by Herbert Druce in 1884. It is found in Costa Rica and possibly Colombia.

References

 

Melese
Moths described in 1884